L'Ascension du haut mal ("The Rise of the High Evil"), published in English as Epileptic, is an autobiographical graphic novel by David Beauchard (more commonly known as David B.).

Publication history
It was originally published in French by L'Association in six volumes from 1996 to 2003:

 1996
 1997
 1998
 1999 
 2000
 2003

The first half of the series was published in English by Fantagraphics in one volume in 2002; a complete edition was released by Pantheon in 2005.

Plot
The book tells the story of the author's early childhood and adolescence, focusing on his relationship with his older brother and younger sister. His brother develops severe and intractable epilepsy, causing the family to seek a variety of solutions from alternative medicine, most dramatically by moving to a commune based on macrobiotic principles. As the epileptic brother loses control of his own life, the artist develops solitary obsessions with cartoons, mythology and war. The book's graphic style becomes increasingly elaborate as the children's fantasy life takes over, with their dreams and fears (including epilepsy itself) appearing as living creatures. In brief interludes, the children appear as adults when the artist begins the process of writing the story.

Translation
The French title proved difficult to translate, as it contains several meanings: haut mal is an archaic term for epilepsy meaning literally "high evil" or "great sickness" (formerly used as a medical term in English, now replaced by grand mal), and ascension can mean either rise or climbing, as seen in a recurring image of the family climbing a steep slope into unknown terrain.

Reception
The English translation of the book received very good reviews from critics. The review aggregator Metacritic reported the book had an average score of 92 out of 100, based on 15 reviews. Publishers Weekly has called it "one of the greatest graphic novels ever published."

Awards
The fourth volume won the 2000 Angoulême International Comics Festival Prize for Scenario. David B. won the 2005 Ignatz Award for Outstanding Artist for his work on the series.

Notes

References 

 L'Ascension du haut mal at Bedetheque

External links 
Pasquier, Renaud  "David B., le sommeil de la raison" in Labyrinthe #25 "La bande dessinée : ce qu'elle dit, ce qu'elle montre", 2006 
Epileptic Is Schizophrenic -- But Interestingly So

1996 comics debuts
1996 graphic novels
2002 graphic novels
2005 graphic novels
Autobiographical graphic novels
Fantagraphics titles
French graphic novels
Pantheon Books graphic novels
Diseases and disorders in comics